is a private university in Satte, Saitama, Japan, established in 2010.

The school has a Department of Nursing.

External links
 Official website 

Educational institutions established in 2010
Private universities and colleges in Japan
Universities and colleges in Saitama Prefecture
2010 establishments in Japan
Nursing schools in Japan
Satte, Saitama